Mankhal is a revenue village and panchayat in Ranga Reddy district, TS, India. It falls under [[Maheswaram
]] mandal.

Rajiv Gandhi International Airport is 8 kilometres away from this village.

Name of the village is taken from the goddess name Mahankali. Mahankali temple is famous here which is there for centuries and it has been reconstructed recently.

References

Villages in Ranga Reddy district